Bobby Lynn Shehorn, (born July 7, 1950) is an American singer-songwriter, musician, author, photographer, and magazine editor.

Early years

Born and raised in Temple, Texas, Bobby Shehorn started his music history playing French horn in the sixth grade. Shehorn began playing guitar professionally in 1965 in local clubs, school dances, and fraternity halls. Before becoming a vocalist, he took an offer in 1967 to play bass with a rock band that was based in Austin named South Canadian Overflow, which included schoolmates John Inmon and Donny Dolan, both of whom later would gain fame as members of the Lost Gonzo Band and backing Jerry Jeff Walker. South Canadian Overflow played in Central and South Texas, including the Vulcan Gas Company in Austin, TX, where they recorded two unreleased tracks for Sonobeat Records on December 12, 1967 with Shehorn on bass.

Woodstock after the Festival

After the demise of South Canadian Overflow and his graduation from high school in 1968, Shehorn moved to Austin. In 1969, he met Bobby Charles, a Chess Records artist who previously wrote music for Bill Haley and the Comets, Fats Domino, and Clarence "Frogman" Henry. After writing several songs together, they moved to New York City, ending up in Woodstock, NY, where Bobby Charles recorded an album for Albert Grossman's Bearsville Record and Shehorn published one song with Grossman.

Back in Austin, Shehorn performing as bandleader and lead vocalist, while Rusty Weir, Lost Gonzo Band and other artists were performing his songs. He worked as a producer in Austin's first 16/24-track studio and started Yellow Rose Records in 1974. In the genre Progressive country, he released the 45 RPM "If I Could Write a Song" backed with "Little Emily" in 1976. It featured two original songs with Shehorn as lead vocalist, playing guitar, bass and piano. He was accompanied by John Inmon, Donny Dolan, Kenny Hoelsher, Tomas Ramirez, Herb Steiner, Marcia Ball, Mary Egan and Lissa Hattersley. Shehorn moved back to Woodstock, NY, in 1981, and after performing on acoustic guitar, occasionally with banjo player Billy Faier, he cut his beard and trimmed his hair to reflect his change in genre. He formed the Bobby Shehorn Rockabilly Band with Jim Newton, Chris Zaloom, Thom Collins, and with Shehorn on bass guitar and lead vocals. Shehorn performed and recorded with many musicians Upstate and in New York City including Pee Wee Ellis, Howie Wyeth, Drew Zingg, Beki Brindle, Sredni Vollmer Rick Danko and Paul Butterfield.

After a short return to Texas and more band gigs, Shehorn moved to Lafayette, LA, in 1988. He became a regular at Tabby's Blues Box in Baton Rouge, where he played with many Delta bluesmen, including Silas Hogan, Henry Gray, Guitar Kelly, Tabby Thomas, and Chris Thomas (King). Back in Woodstock in 1989, his Bobby Shehorn Blues Band, a "regional favorite," performed more in New York and the southeast.

Dallas Blues

Positive response from crowds in the Dallas/Fort Worth area and the thriving Dallas Blues scene convinced Shehorn to move to Dallas after his last tour in 1990. Staying in one area for 15 years, Bobby Shehorn again performed with talented and influential players in Dallas, including Sam Myers, drummer Tommy Hill, Curly "Barefoot" Miller and Brian “Hash Brown” Calway. In 1997, Shehorn released the CD Bigger Than, with songs that he recorded in Dallas.

Further writing career

In 2005, Anchor Communications published his book Pioneer History of Dallas, Texas: A Masonic Prospective, 1848–1874, which was generally well-received. Shehorn was a guest speaker for many organizations and public events, including the Dallas Landmark Dedication Ceremony for Pioneer Cemetery, May 25, 2003. Shehorn returned again to Austin and had been researching the history of tattooing in for a possible book. This led to him writing for Skin&Ink, The Tattoo Magazine for four years, publishing his photos along with text in articles.

Settling in Austin, in 2005 Shehorn launched Texas Tattoo Magazine in 2008 as editor and principal contributor, gaining readers and fans worldwide. In 2013, he released a CD Still Called The Blues on his original Yellow Rose Records. Becoming immersed in the blues scene, he has played with Matthew Robinson, Margaret Wright, Hosea Hargrove, Soul Man Sam, and Johnny B. Goode.

References

External links
https://www.facebook.com/bobby.shehorn

Living people
People from Temple, Texas
Singer-songwriters from Texas
1950 births